Microchaetina is a genus of bristle flies in the family Tachinidae.

Species
Microchaetina arida (Townsend, 1911)
Microchaetina cinerea Wulp, 1891
Microchaetina mexicana (Townsend, 1892)
Microchaetina petiolata (Townsend, 1919)
Microchaetina rubidiapex (Reinhard, 1942)
Microchaetina sinuata (Townsend, 1919)
Microchaetina subnitens (Reinhard, 1942)
Microchaetina teleta Reinhard, 1962
Microchaetina valida (Townsend, 1892)

References

Dexiinae
Diptera of South America
Diptera of North America
Tachinidae genera
Taxa named by Frederik Maurits van der Wulp